Black and White is a 2010 Turkish drama film directed by Ahmet Boyacıoğlu which tells the stories of a group of regulars at a famous bar in Ankara, and was described by the director as being a film "about loneliness, growing old, friendship, solidarity, and that special bond you feel for Ankara." The film, which takes its name from the Siyah Beyaz Bar and Art Gallery where it is set, is according to Today's Zaman reviewer Emine Yıldırım "an adamant ode to this bar", which "has been a landmark of high-end art and upper-crust intellectualism for longer than 20 years...and on a larger scale, the city it represents through its group of characters."

Plot 
A painter who has lived a stormy life that still rages on in his 70s; a lawyer who, forced to retire after a heart attack, spends his time feeding snails and searching for the quiet life; a doctor weary of his job and abandoned by his wife; a businesswoman who has fashioned loneliness into a lifestyle... These are the regulars of Ankara’s 25-year-old bar, Black & White, who gather here every evening. And then there is the bar’s manager Faruk, a stubborn, grumpy, touchy but extremely sweet man.

One day, Faruk announces that he can no longer go on running the bar, and wants to shut it down. The regulars try their best to dissuade him.

Production 
Ahmet Boyacıoğlu, who made his feature directorial debut, following his award-winning 2001 short The Funeral, with this film, is according to Hürriyet Daily News reviewer Emrah Güler, a revered name for film enthusiasts in Turkey. He’s the founder of the Ankara Cinema Association; organizer of the traveling film festival, the Festival on Wheels; representative of Turkey in Eurimages; a crucial name in Turkey’s Golden Boll Film Festival; and the unfaltering jury member and name covering various international film festivals for daily Radikal. And that, The cast and the crew are a testament to the respect and admiration felt for one of Turkey’s ultimate cinema lovers.

Release

General release

Festival screenings 
 47th Antalya "Golden Orange" International Film Festival (October 9–14, 2010)
 59th Mannheim-Heidelberg Film Festival (November 11–21, 2010)
 16th Festival on Wheels (December 3–19, 2010)

Reception

Box office
The film was in the Turkish box office charts for 18 weeks and made a total gross of US$242,743.

Reviews
Today's Zaman reviewer Emine Yıldırım, states that this is, a film specifically addressing a certain group of people—those who are above 35, who are well off and those who consider themselves a part of a certain intellectual circle, and, for viewers who do not share the same socio-economic background or come from the same generation, the characters can come off as self-indulgent. This is not a film where much happens except for long group dialogues, Yıldırım continues, and although the director, also portrays them in their personal, intimate and alone moments, these single character studies are somehow not enough to completely engage the audience. Yıldırım further contends that, the characters that are best drawn out in this film are not the men but women, and, both female performances are close to perfect. The film has very sweet moments of friendship, and its restrained camera work and editing ooze a certain serenity and composure; however, according to Yıldırım, one sometimes wishes that the makers of the film occasionally smashed this sterile world of modernity to pieces.

See also
 Turkish films of 2010

References

External links
  for the film (Turkish)
 

2010 films
2010 drama films
Films set in Turkey
Turkish drama films
Films shot in Ankara